The Marathi Vishwakosh is an online free encyclopedia in Marathi language, funded by the Government of Maharashtra, India.

The project to create the encyclopedia started as a print project and was inaugurated in 1960, and Lakshman Shastri Joshi was named the first president of the project.  The first volumes were published in 1976, and eventually 18 volumes were published by 2010.  The encyclopedia began publishing the existing volumes on the internet on October 25, 2011, as announced by the Chief Minister of Maharashtra in Mumbai.  Currently nineteen volumes of the encyclopedia are available online on the Internet.

Editors-in-Chief of Marathi Vishwakosh
The editors-in-chief of the Vishwakosh are as follows

See also

 Marathi Language

References

External links
 Official website
 Marathi Vishwakosh Online

Marathi encyclopedias
Indian online encyclopedias
Marathi-language literature
1976 non-fiction books
20th-century encyclopedias
21st-century encyclopedias
21st-century Indian books
20th-century Indian books